Trechus abeillei is a species of ground beetle in the subfamily Trechinae. It was described by Pandelle in 1872.

References

abeillei
Beetles described in 1872